Cartlandia is a food cart pod in Portland, Oregon, United States.

Description
The pod is located near the intersection of 82nd Avenue and the Springwater Corridor in southeast Portland's Brentwood-Darlington neighborhood. Businesses have included Nacheaux and Taste of Mongolia.

History
Owner Roger Goldingay opened the pod in 2011. In 2016, he joined a coalition to sue the city and Mayor Charlie Hales in an effort to overturn a law permitting homeless people to camp and sleep on sidewalks. The pod was burglarized in 2016 and 2020.

References

External links

 

2011 establishments in Oregon
Brentwood-Darlington, Portland, Oregon
Food carts in Portland, Oregon